Sir John Andrew McKay, CBE, OStJ, QPM (28 November 1912 – 24 October 2004) was Chief Inspector of Constabulary from 1970 until 1972.

McKay was educated at the  University of Glasgow. He joined the Metropolitan Police in 1935. He was seconded to the Army between 1943 and 1947. After this he was appointed Assistant Chief Constable, then Deputy Chief Constable of the Birmingham City Police. He was Chief Constable of the Manchester City Police from 1959 to 1966 when he joined HM's Inspectorate of Constabulary.

References

British Chief Constables
Scottish recipients of the Queen's Police Medal
Knights Bachelor
Chief Inspectors of Constabulary (England and Wales)
Commanders of the Order of the British Empire
Officers of the Order of St John
1912 births
2004 deaths
Alumni of the University of Glasgow